San Felipe Pueblo (Eastern Keres: Katishtya, Navajo Tsédááʼkin) is a census-designated place (CDP) in Sandoval County, New Mexico, United States, and is located 10 miles (16 km) north of Bernalillo. As of the 2000 census, the CDP population was 2,080. It is part of the Albuquerque Metropolitan Statistical Area.

Description
The Pueblo, founded in 1706, is home to a Native American Nation who speak an eastern dialect of the Keresan languages.

The Pueblo celebrates the annual Feast of St. Philip on May 1, when hundreds of pueblo people participate in traditional corn dances.

Today, the tribe operates Black Mesa Casino formerly San Felipe Casino and Casino Hollywood, just off Interstate 25.

Geography
San Felipe Pueblo is located at  (35.426985, -106.443593).

According to the United States Census Bureau, the CDP has a total area of 12.2 square miles (31.6 km), of which 11.9 square miles (30.8 km) is land and 0.3 square mile (0.8 km) (2.46%) is water.

Demographics

As of the census of 2000, there were 2,080 people, 368 households, and 341 families residing in the CDP. The population density was 174.6 people per square mile (67.4/km). There were 405 housing units at an average density of 34.0 per square mile (13.1/km). The racial makeup of the CDP was 99.18% Native American, 0.10% White, 0.29% from other races, and 0.43% from two or more races. Hispanic or Latino of any race were 0.62% of the population.

There were 368 households, out of which 45.1% had children under the age of 18 living with them, 34.8% were married couples living together, 38.9% had a female householder with no husband present, and 7.1% were non-families. 5.4% of all households were made up of individuals, and 0.5% had someone living alone who was 65 years of age or older. The average household size was 5.65 and the average family size was 5.60.

In the CDP, the population was spread out, with 37.7% under the age of 18, 12.0% from 18 to 24, 31.3% from 25 to 44, 14.7% from 45 to 64, and 4.3% who were 65 years of age or older. The median age was 25 years. For every 100 females, there were 102.7 males. For every 100 females age 18 and over, there were 96.2 males.

The median income for a household in the CDP was $29,800, and the median income for a family was $28,264. Males had a median income of $17,162 versus $16,771 for females. The per capita income for the CDP was $6,225. About 34.3% of families and 38.2% of the population were below the poverty line, including 49.1% of those under the age of 18 and 42.1% of those 65 and older.

Education
It is in the Bernalillo Public Schools district. Algodones Elementary School is the zoned elementary school that takes students from San Felipe Pueblo. The zoned middle school of this community is Bernalillo Middle School. The Bernalillo district's zoned high school is Bernalillo High School.

The Bureau of Indian Education (BIE) operates the San Felipe Pueblo Elementary School, a federal elementary school for Native American children, in the pueblo.

See also

 List of census-designated places in New Mexico
 San Felipe Indian Reservation

References

External links

American Indian reservations in New Mexico
Census-designated places in Sandoval County, New Mexico
Census-designated places in New Mexico
Native American tribes in New Mexico
Albuquerque metropolitan area
New Mexico populated places on the Rio Grande
Puebloan peoples